Apotrepus densicollis is a species of true weevil in the beetle family Curculionidae. It is found in North America. Adults are associated with dead saguaro.

References

Further reading

 
 

Cossoninae
Articles created by Qbugbot
Beetles described in 1892
Beetles of North America